Count Kaspar Maria von Sternberg (also: Caspar Maria, Count Sternberg), 1761, Prague – 1838, Březina Castle), was a Bohemian theologian, mineralogist, geognost, entomologist and botanist. He is known as the "Father of Paleobotany".. His parents were Count Johann Nepomuk von Sternberg and Countess Anna Josefa Kolowrat-Krakowsky.

He established the Bohemian National Museum in Prague — his collection of minerals, fossils and plant specimens formed the core collection of the museum, and he is deemed to be the founder of modern paleobotany. As of 1820 he was on friendly terms with Johann Wolfgang von Goethe.

Originally a student of theology, he attended the Collegium anglicum in Rome, from where he obtained a lower ordination. Inspired by the newly founded Regensburg Botanical Society (1790), he became an avid naturalist, subsequently becoming a prominent member of the society, making contributions to its Botanisches Taschenbuch and also establishing a botanical garden in Regensburg. In 1805, during an extended stay in Paris, he met with Alexander von Humboldt and came under the influence of a number of French paleontologists and botanists. Afterwards, he relocated to an estate in Radnice, Bohemia. Here, he created a botanical garden, and conducted important paleobotanical research at recently opened coal mines located in the surrounding areas.

The botanical genus Sternbergia is named in his honor.

Publications
 Abhandlung über die Pflanzenkunde in Böhmen (two volumes 1817-1818) - Treatise on the botany of Bohemia.
 Briefwechsel (1820-1832) - Correspondence with Johann Wolfgang von Goethe.
 Versuch einer geognostisch-botanischen Darstellung der Flora der Vorwelt (with August Karl Joseph Corda, 1820-1825; two volumes) - Attempt at a geognostic-botanical description of primordial flora.
 Ausgewählte Werke des Grafen Kaspar von Sternberg, 1902 - Selected works of Count Kaspar von Sternberg.
 Leben des Grafen Kaspar von Sternberg, 2010 - The life of Count Kaspar von Sternberg.

The standard botanical author abbreviation Sternb. is applied to species he described.

References

External links

The Sternberg Project

1761 births
1838 deaths
Bryologists
Pteridologists
Botanists with author abbreviations
Paleobotanists
German entomologists
Czech paleontologists
Scientists from Prague
Kaspar Maria von
Bohemian nobility